Peter Mesier may refer to:
 Peter Mesier Jr., American merchant and politician
 Peter Mesier Sr., his father, American merchant and politician